Aaron Bramwell, (born 1 March 1986 in Aberdare, Rhondda Cynon Taf, Wales) is a rugby union player for Neath RFC in the Principality Premiership.

Career
Bramwell has previously played for Dunvant RFC, Swansea RFC, Neath RFC and Ebbw Vale RFC. Bramwell is a current Wales Sevens player. Bramwell was elected Principality Player of the Month in October 2008. Bramwell also is one of 11 players to go on and be capped at all levels. Bramwell is currently selected for the Wales 7s team to the IRB 2010 Hong Kong 7s Tournament. His position of choice is at Outside Half. Bramwell is considered to be a valuable player in modern-day rugby football as he has gained experience in a number of positions on the playing field.

References

External links
Pontypridd RFC profile

1986 births
Living people
Pontypridd RFC players
Welsh rugby union players
Male rugby sevens players
Rugby union players from Aberdare